A number of massacres (pogroms) targeting the Jewish population took place in German-occupied Poland during World War II. They occurred in the early months of Operation Barbarossa, the German invasion of the Soviet Union in the summer of 1941.

List of pogroms
 Radziłów pogrom by local Poles on 7 July 1941.
Jedwabne pogrom in Jedwabne, carried out by its Polish inhabitants on 10 July 1941.
 Lviv pogroms in Lwów (now Lviv, Ukraine), perpetrated by German security forces and Ukrainian nationalists from 30 June to 2 July 1941, and from 25 to 29 July 1941.
 Szczuczyn pogrom in Szczuczyn, carried out by its Polish inhabitants in June 1941.
 Tykocin pogrom  in Tykocin, perpetrated by personnel of Einsatzgruppe B on August 25, 1941.
 Wąsosz pogrom in Wąsosz, carried out by Poles on 5 July 1941.

See also
 The Holocaust in Poland
 Kaunas pogrom

1941 in Poland
Mass murder in 1941
Poland in World War II
Holocaust massacres and pogroms in Poland
World War II crimes in Poland